Barcelona Traction, Light and Power Company (BTLP) (locally known as  in Spanish and  in Catalan, "The Canadian") was a Canadian utility company that operated light and power utilities in Catalonia, Spain. It was incorporated on September 12, 1911 in Toronto, Ontario, Canada by Frederick Stark Pearson.  The company was developed by Belgian-American engineer Dannie Heineman.

It operated in Spain but was owned mostly by the Belgian holding companies SOFINA and SIDRO and became the subject of the important International Court of Justice case, Belgium v. Spain (1970).

Pearson died in the 1915 sinking of the Lusitania.

1919 strike

In 1919, a conflict between a BTLP subsidiary, and eight office workers escalated into a 44-days general strike called by the Anarcho-Syndicalist National Confederation of Labour halting Barcelona and 70% of the Catalan industry.
A labour success, the strike ended with a law establishing an 8-hours workday for all Spain, the liberation of imprisoned workers without a pending process, wage rises for  workers and half wage for the month spent striking.

Juan March

Juan March was a Spaniard from Mallorca in the Balearic Islands who had begun his career as a smuggler and had become an industrialist and banker.
He had to quit Spain after the government of the Second Spanish Republic tried to arrest him.
In 1936, he financed a right-wing and military coup that ended as a three-year Spanish Civil War.
March was widely known for involvement in lucrative illegal activities, for bribery and political influence, and for bending the law whenever he saw a benefit. This was exemplified in his 1948 takeover of the Barcelona Traction, Light, and Power Company (BTLP) for a small fraction of its real worth.

BTLP was a utility company which provided power and streetcar services in Barcelona; originally incorporated in Canada, it was mostly owned by Belgian investors. BTLP had come through the civil war largely undamaged, and was quite profitable. Its assets were about £10,000,000 (about $500,000,000 in 2010). However, for the convenience of some of its foreign investors, BTLP had issued some bonds denominated in pounds, and the interest on these bonds was payable in pounds. The Spanish government had imposed currency restrictions: BTLP was unable to exchange its Spanish pesetas for pounds, and so could not pay the interest.

This was not viewed with any great alarm by the bond-holders; BTLP had plenty of pesetas and would pay the interest arrears whenever the currency restrictions were relaxed.

However, March scented an opportunity. Agents secretly acting for him quietly bought up the bonds (about £500,000). Then in February 1948, they appeared in a Spanish court, asserted that BTLP was in default on the bonds, and demanded immediate relief. The judge agreed and awarded ownership of all BTLP's assets to them (in fact to March). BTLP's foreign investors appealed, but got no relief from Spanish courts. The Belgian government appealed to the International Court of Justice but to no avail: the final resolution coming in 1970, eight years after March's death.

Lawsuit

The government of Spain under Franco in the 1960s placed restrictions on foreigners doing business in Spain.  The Belgian stockholders in Barcelona Traction lost money and wanted to sue in the International Court of Justice, but in the court Judge Fornier ruled on the side of Spain, holding that only the state in which the corporation was incorporated (Canada) can sue.  The decision in Belgium v. Spain is important in public international law because it demonstrates the importance of protections of corporate nationality in nominal ("paper") terms over effective nationality (siège social) where the ownership effectively resides.  Unless a principle of law permits a country to espouse a national's claim in the ICJ, there cannot be an espousal.

The case is also important as it demonstrates how the concept of diplomatic protection under international law can apply equally to corporations as to individuals. It also expanded the notion of obligations owed  (in relation to everyone) in the international community.

Acquisitions
  (1912)
  (1911-1913)
  (1912)
  (1912)
  (1923)
  (1923)
 
 
  (1930)
  (1933)
  (1935)
  (1941)

See also
 List of International Court of Justice cases

References
ICJ case summary

Energy companies established in 1911
Energy companies disestablished in 1948
1970 in international relations
1970 in Spain
Francoist Spain
Belgium–Spain relations
1911 establishments in Ontario
1948 disestablishments in Spain
Transport companies established in 1911
Transport companies disestablished in 1948
Canadian companies established in 1911
Defunct electric power companies of Canada
Defunct electric power companies of Spain